Cacophony is harsh, often discordant sounds.

Cacophony may also refer to:
 Cacophony (band), a heavy metal band
 Cacophony (album), a 1987 album by Rudimentary Peni
 Batman: Cacophony, a comic book series
 Cacophony Society, an artist/culture-jamming group